KJLT-FM is a Christian radio station licensed to North Platte, Nebraska, broadcasting on 94.9 MHz FM.  The station is owned by Tri-State Broadcasting Association.

Programming
KJLT-FM plays a variety of Christian Music, as well as Christian Talk and Teaching programming including; Insight for Living with Chuck Swindoll, Love Worth Finding with Adrian Rogers, Focus on the Family, and Joni and Friends.

History
The station began broadcasting September 24, 1979, and originally held the call sign KODY-FM, airing a country music format. The station was owned by North Platte Broadcasting. In 1986, the station's call sign was changed to KSRZ-FM. As KSRZ-FM, the station aired an adult contemporary format. In 1990, the station was sold to Tri-State Broadcasting for $85,000.

That year, the station's call sign was changed to KJLT-FM, and the station adopted a Christian format, becoming an FM companion to the much older KJLT (AM)

Translators
KJLT-FM is also heard on translators throughout Nebraska and North-East Colorado.

References

External links
KJLT's official website

JLT
Radio stations established in 1979
1979 establishments in Nebraska